Swami is a Hindu honorific title, which also has other meanings such as the husband, possessor, or owner.

Swami or Swamy may also refer to:

Literature and fictional characters
"The Swami", an alter ego of Chris Berman
 Swami, the central character of books like Swami and Friends (1935) and Malgudi Days (1943) by R. K. Narayan
 Swami (novel), a 1962 novel by Ranjit Desai

Films
Swami (1977 film), a Hindi film directed by Basu Chatterjee
Swamy (2004 film), a Telugu film directed by V. R. Pratap
 Swamy (2005 film), a Kannada film directed by M. S. Ramesh
Swami (2007 film), a Hindi film

People 
 Swamy (surname)

Other
 Swami belt, a kind of climbing harness
 Swami Records, a record label
 Swami (band), a United Kingdom band
 Swami, a software used for editing SoundFont files
 Swami's (surfing), an Encinitas, California, surfing spot

See also 
 Suomi (disambiguation) (pronounced as swami in Finnish)